Amphimas is a small genus of flowering plants in the legume family, Fabaceae. It belongs to the subfamily Faboideae. It is a west African tree used for medicine and for wood. Amphimas was traditionally assigned to the tribe Sophoreae; however, recent molecular phylogenetic analyses reassigned Amphimas into an unspecified position in the Meso-Papilionoideae.

References

Faboideae
Fabaceae genera